Richville is an unincorporated community in southeastern Douglas County, Missouri, United States. Richville is located at the intersection of Missouri State Route 14 and State route W and a short distance west of the intersection of Route 14 and Missouri State Route 181. Sauls Knob at  lies just to the southeast on the south side of Route 14.

History
A post office called Richville was established in 1870, and remained in operation until 1933. The community was named after the local Rich family.

References

Unincorporated communities in Douglas County, Missouri
Unincorporated communities in Missouri